Christopher Martin "Marty" Johnstone (1951–1979) was a New Zealand drug trafficker born in Auckland. The former Takapuna Grammar pupil was dubbed "Mr Asia" by the Auckland Star newspaper in August 1978 in a series of articles by Pat Booth.

Murder
In October 1979, Johnstone was lured to Britain on the pretext of a drug deal to take place in Scotland. He was murdered by Andy Maher, by order of Terrance John Clark, and his handless body was dumped in Eccleston Delph, Lancashire. Maher cut off Johnstone's hands and mutilated his face in a vain attempt to foil dental identification by the police.

Terry Clark, along with four others, was subsequently convicted of murdering Johnstone and was sentenced to life imprisonment. The trial at Lancaster Castle in 1980 was conducted under heavy security and was Britain's most expensive case at that time. Clark suffered a heart attack in 1983 and died in prison on the Isle of Wight.

References

Further reading
 Hall, Richard (2004). Greed: The Mr Asia Connection. Rowville, Victoria: Five Mile Press.  

1951 births
1979 deaths
1979 murders in the United Kingdom
New Zealand drug traffickers
New Zealand people murdered abroad
People murdered in England
People educated at Takapuna Grammar School
Murdered gangsters